The P. D. Hinduja National Hospital and Medical Research Centre is a multi-specialty, tertiary-care hospital in Mumbai, India. It was founded in 1951 by Parmanand Deepchand Hinduja, in collaboration with the Massachusetts General Hospital, the main teaching hospital of Harvard Medical School, Boston.  The hospital is owned and operated by the London-based Hinduja Group, through Hinduja Healthcare Limited, which also operates Hinduja Healthcare Surgical at Khar, Mumbai.  Its Chief Executive Officer is Gautam Khanna.

Hinduja Hospital is ranked the 6th-best hospital in India, 3rd-best among the private hospitals in India, best in Western India, best multi-speciality hospital in metros, and the cleanest hospital in Mumbai.

Academics 
 Diplomate of National Board (DNB) in 25 specialties and super-specialties, accredited by the National Board of Examinations.
 BSc, MSc and PhD degrees in Nursing, awarded by the Maharashtra University of Health Sciences.
 Allied Health Science courses in 10 disciplines, affiliated to the Health Sector Skill Council.

Charity 

Hinduja Hospital, Mahim, is a not-for-profit institution, with at least 20% of its total capacity reserved for people from the economically weaker section. It has committed 10% of its total beds for subsidised / concessional treatments, and 10% beds for completely free treatments.

Specialities
Hinduja National Hospital is a major referral centre in India for the 55 specialities:

Expansion 

It has plans to expand its nationwide capacity to 5,000 beds, besides setting up radiology and pathology diagnostic centres, emergency ambulance services and pharmacy retail outlets across India.
It is also working with the Biomedical Engineering and Technology (incubation) Centre (BETiC) of IIT Bombay to co-develop and commercialise biomedical devices.

Notable doctors
 B. K. Misra - Neurosurgeon
Gustad Daver - Cardio-thoracic, vascular and transplant surgeon
 Indira Hinduja - Gynaecologist
 Luis Jose De Souza - Surgical oncologist
 Milind Vasant Kirtane - Otorhinolaryngologist
Rasik Shah - Paediatric surgeon & Urologist
Sanjay Agarwala - Orthopaedic surgeon
Sultan Pradhan - Surgical oncologist
 Suresh Advani - Medical oncologist
 Tehemton Erach Udwadia - Gastroenterologist
 Zarir Udwadia - Pulmonologist

References

External links
Official website

Hospital buildings completed in 1951
Hospitals in Mumbai
Hospitals established in 1951
Hinduja Group
1951 establishments in Bombay State
20th-century architecture in India